Rachel Khong (born 1985) is an American writer and editor based in San Francisco.

Life 
Khong was born in Malaysia to a Malaysian Chinese family. She grew up in Rancho Cucamonga, California and attended high school in nearby Diamond Bar, California.

Khong attended Yale University and graduated with a degree in English in 2007. She received her MFA from University of Florida in 2011, where she studied with Padgett Powell.

Khong is married to Eli Horowitz, co-creator of Gimlet's Homecoming podcast, and former editor at McSweeney's.

Career 
After completing her graduate degree, Khong moved to San Francisco and worked in the food service industry. She had interned at McSweeney's while in college and edited cookbooks for them after graduating. In 2011, Chris Ying of Lucky Peach, who Khong had met while interning at McSweeney's, asked her to be the managing editor of the magazine. She later went on to become executive editor of Lucky Peach.

Khong cofounded The Ruby in 2018, a female oriented co-working space based in Mission District, San Francisco.

Writing 
Her writing has appeared in publications such as American Short Fiction, Joyland, and The San Francisco Chronicle. She is the coauthor of a cookbook called All About Eggs.

Her first novel, Goodbye, Vitamin, received Best Book of the Year honors from NPR, O, The Oprah Magazine, the San Francisco Chronicle, and Vogue. The story was inspired by her grandmother's battle with Alzheimer's disease. The novel won the 2017 California Book Award for First Fiction, as well as a Los Angeles Times Book Prize Finalist for First Fiction. Universal Pictures optioned the film rights in June 2019, with Constance Wu attached to lead.

FilmNation Entertainment announced on February 5, 2021 that they and Ali Wong are producing an adaptation of Khong's short story, The Freshening, with director Cathy Yan set to write and direct. She has written book reviews for the New York Times, including of novels by Maria Kuznetsova and Sarah Elaine Smith.

Works 
Novels
Goodbye, Vitamin (2017) , 
Short stories
The Freshening (2018)

References

External links 

 Rachel Khong's website
Interview with the Asian-American Writer's Workshop

1985 births
Living people
Yale University alumni
Asian writers
University of Florida alumni
American magazine editors
Women magazine editors
Malaysian people of Chinese descent
Malaysian emigrants to the United States
People who lost Malaysian citizenship